Radio Station "Mir" Međugorje is a Catholic radio station from Međugorje, Bosnia and Herzegovina. It is broadcast from several FM transmitters in its home country and Croatia.

History 
Radio station started with broadcasting on 25 November 1997. It has been created first and foremost in order to transmit the Prayer Programme from the Parish Church of Međugorje.

On 4 October 1999 it started broadcast program on the Internet.

Frequencies
The program is currently broadcast at 14 frequencies:

 Banja Luka 
 Jajce 
 Fojnica 
 Olovo 
 Međugorje 
 Mostar  
 Nova Bila 
 Žepče 
 Zenica 
 Herzegovina 
 Bugojno 
 Prozor 
 Banja Luka 
 Plješivica

See also 
 List of radio stations in Bosnia and Herzegovina
 Radio Maria

References

External links 
 
 Communications Regulatory Agency of Bosnia and Herzegovina
 Radiopostaja MIR Međugorje on Facebook.

Radio stations in Bosnia and Herzegovina
Međugorje
Radio stations established in 1997